Sardarkrushinagar Dantiwada Agricultural University (SDAU) is a State Agricultural University in India.

History 
The Gujarat Agricultural University started functioning in June 1972. It was established with specific mandates of promoting productivity of agriculture by pursuing research in agriculture and allied sciences. The unique feature of the Gujarat Agricultural University was a multi-campus set-up. The other three campuses were at Junagadh, Navsari and Anand.

Since 2004, the GAU was split into four campuses. The Gujarat Agricultural University started functioning with specific mandates for promoting productivity of agriculture through the pursuance of research in agriculture and allied sciences. The Gujarat Agricultural University had 11 constituent colleges faculties which undertook undergraduate and postgraduate teaching under a semester system.

The total number of students who have graduated from the Gujarat Agricultural University (until 1996) were 8532 in Agriculture, Veterinary Science, Renewable Energy & Environmental Engineering, Dairy Science, Basic Science and HumanitiesAgricultural Engineering, Horticulture and Forestry, Home Science and Fisheries. 2159 students have obtained Masters, and 393 have acquired their PhD degrees.

Campuses
Gujarat Agricultural University does not exist any more. The four campuses of Gujarat Agricultural University were converted into four independent universities on May 1, 2004 by Gujarat Government through the Gujarat Agricultural Universities Act 2004.

The Sardarkrushinagar campus in Dantiwada Taluka (earlier the headquarters of GAU) is known as Sardarkrushinagar Dantiwada Agricultural University and has ten colleges:
 Shri G.N. Patel College of  Dairy Technology
 College of Food Technology
 C.P. College of Agriculture
 College of Agriculture at Tharad
 College of Veterinary Science and Animal Husbandry
 ASPEE College of Home Science
 College of Agri-Business Management
 College of Basic Science & Humanities 
 College of Renewable Energy & Environmental Engineering
 College of Horticulture, Jagudan(Mahesana)
[Note:- In year 2021 all the dairy , veterinary & fisheries colleges are removed from all agricultural university located in gujarat & Now this colleges operate under Kamdhenu University.]
The other agriculture universities which were converted into universities from GAU are Anand Agricultural University, Navsari Agricultural University, Navsari and Junagadh Agricultural University, Junagadh.

References

External links
Sardarkrushinagar Dantiwada Agricultural University: Gujarat Agricultural University

Universities in Gujarat
Agricultural universities and colleges in Gujarat
Banaskantha district
1972 establishments in Gujarat
Educational institutions established in 1972